Eminlik is a village in Tarsus district of Mersin Province, Turkey. It is situated in the Taurus Mountains and extreme east of the province. The population of village was 138  as of 2012.

References

Villages in Tarsus District